William John Glennie ( – ) is a former Canadian ice hockey right winger and coach who played mainly in England. He had a long association with both of the Harringay teams in the 1940s and 1950s, scoring over 1000 points in 613 games in the UK. He was inducted into the British Ice Hockey Hall of Fame in 1951.

Career
Glennie first came to England when he served with the Canadian Army during the Second World War. He was stationed in Hampshire where he met and married a local girl. After the war, Glennie returned to North America and played the 1945–46 season with the Washington Lions in the Eastern Hockey League.

In 1946, Glennie returned to England and joined the Harringay Greyhounds in the English National League. He helped them to win the playoffs in his first season and was named to the league's All Star A-team, an honour he was to receive twice more while still with the Greyhounds in 1949 and 1950. In 1951, Glennie joined the Greyhounds' sister club, the Harringay Racers, as player-coach. Guiding the team to win the newly formed British National League in the 1954–55 season, Glennie earned himself another English National League All Star A-team place in 1953–54, as well as English National League All Star B-team places in 1952 and 1953 and British National League All Star B-team places in 1956, 1957 and 1958. Glennie was also named as the coach for the British National League All Star B team in 1958.

After retiring from playing and coaching, Glennie, having impressed his employers at Harringay Stadium, was appointed an executive position with the company. He eventually went on to be the general manager of the Powderhall Stadium in Edinburgh, near where he and his wife made their permanent home in Longniddry.

Awards and honours
Named to the English National League All Star A-team in 1947, 1949, 1950 and 1954.
Inducted to the British Ice Hockey Hall of Fame in 1951.
Named to the English National League All Star B-team in 1952 and 1953.
Named to the British National League All Star B-team in 1956, 1947 and 1958.
Named as coach to the British National League All Star B-team in 1958.

Footnotes

References
Ice Hockey Journalists UK
The Internet Hockey Database

External links
British Ice Hockey Hall of Fame entry

1924 births
2005 deaths
British Ice Hockey Hall of Fame inductees
Canadian ice hockey right wingers
Canadian emigrants to England
Harringay Greyhounds players
Harringay Racers players
Ice hockey people from Manitoba
Sportspeople from Portage la Prairie
Washington Lions players
Canadian emigrants to the United Kingdom
Canadian military personnel of World War II